The British Consul General in New York is head of the British Consulate General in New York, United States, which provide services to British nationals living in and visiting New York, New Jersey, Pennsylvania, and Fairfield County in Connecticut.

The office predates 1857 and played a critical role when the capitol of the United States was New York.  One of the earliest Consuls-General was Thomas Henry Barclay, a native New Yorker who was a Loyalist during the American Revolution who later served the Crown as a resident of Nova Scotia.  He served as Consul-General in New York from 1799 (to 1822), replacing Sir John Temple, the first Consul-General and also native born to North America.

The consulate is located in an office block at 845 Third Avenue, New York.

Consuls-General of the United Kingdom in New York
1857–1883: Sir Edward Archibald Consul from 1857, Consul-General from 1871
1883–1894: Sir William Booker
1894–1907: Sir Percy Sanderson
1907–1915: Sir Courtenay Bennett
1915–1919: Charles Bayley1919: Wilfred Thesiger appointed but did not proceed1920–1931: Sir Gloster Armstrong
1931–1938: Sir Gerald Campbell
1938–1944: Sir Godfrey Haggard
1944–1950: Sir Francis Evans
1951–1953: Sir Henry Hobson
1953–1957: Sir Francis Rundall
1957–1960: Sir Hugh Stephenson
1960–1964: Sir Alan Williams
1964–1966: Sir Stanley Tomlinson
1966–1971: Sir Anthony Rouse
1971–1975: John Ford
1975–1980: Sir Gordon Booth
1980–1983: Sir Hugh Overton
1983–1986: Sir Francis Kennedy
1986–1988: Sir James Mellon
1989–1991: Sir Gordon Jewkes
1991–1996: Sir Alistair Hunter
1996–1999: Jeffrey Ling
1999–2004: Sir Thomas Harris
2004–2007: Sir Philip Thomas
2007–2011: Sir Alan Collins
2011–2016: Danny Lopez
2016–2017: Antonia Romeo
2017–: Antony Phillipson
2021–present: Emma Wade-Smith

References

External links
British Consulate General New York, gov.uk''

Consuls-General, New York
New York
United Kingdom